Arthroteles is a genus of snipe fly of the family Rhagionidae. Species of Arthroteles are moderately sized, from 5 to 7.5 mm. They are gray to dark gray in colour. Their antenna bears seven to eight tapering flagellomeres, the first much larger than all others.

They are only known from South Africa.

Species
Arthroteles bombyliiformis Bezzi, 1926
Arthroteles cinerea Stuckenberg, 1956
Arthroteles longipalpis Nagatomi & Nagatomi, 1990
Arthroteles orophila Stuckenberg, 1956

References

Rhagionidae
Diptera of Africa
Taxa named by Mario Bezzi
Brachycera genera